Battle for Endor may refer to:

 Ewoks: The Battle for Endor, a 1985 movie
 Battle for Endor, a 1987 Star Wars board game